Balliales is an order of red algae belonging to the class Florideophyceae. The order consists only one family, Balliaceae. with only one genus - Ballia Harvey.

The genus of Balliales was circumscribed by William Henry Harvey in J. Bot. (Hooker) vol.2 on page 191 in 1840.

The genus name of Balliales is in honour of Anne Elizabeth Ball (1808–1872), who was an Irish botanist, amateur algologist, and botanical illustrator.

Species
As accepted by AlgaeBase;
 Ballia callitricha 
 Ballia chilensis 	
 Ballia crassa 	
 Ballia nana 
 Ballia pennoides 	
 Ballia sertularioides 
 Ballia vestium

References

Florideophyceae
Red algae orders